Head Games: The Global Concussion Crisis is an expanded version of Head Games (2012), a 2012 documentary film that examines the effects of repeated concussions and subconcussive blows, particularly those associated with sports. It focuses on American football and hockey, but also covers boxing, soccer, lacrosse, and professional wrestling. It covers findings that chronic traumatic brain injury is occurring in female sports. Also covered is physiological evidence of brain injury in adolescent athletes.

Head Games is directed by Steve James, director of the highly acclaimed documentary, Hoop Dreams. It is a film followup to Christopher Nowinski's book, Head Games.

The film features interviews with Nowinski (founder of the Sports Legacy Institute), Dr. Robert Cantu (a professor of neurosurgery at Boston University School of Medicine, Dr. Ann McKee, and Robert Stern, who are experts on chronic traumatic encephalopathy). In addition to other medical experts, it also extensively interviews athletes, their families, and journalists.

Details

Title 
Head Games was inspired by the book Head Games written by former Ivy League football player and WWE wrestler Christopher Nowinski.

Cast 
Head Games: The Global Concussion Crisis (2014)

Bob Costas
Brendan Shanahan 
Robert Cantu, MD
Ann McKee, MD 
Robert Stern, PhD
Hunt Batjer, MD 
Gary Dorshimer, MD
Ruben Echemendia, PhD
Douglas Smith, MD
Steven Galetta, MD
Laura Balcer, MD, MSCE
Christina Master, MD
Dr. Willie Stewart
Dr. Barry O'Driscoll
Dr. James Robson
Greg "Diesel" Williams
Dr. Alan Pearce
David Dodick, MD
Dr. Huw Williams

Head Games (2012)

Christopher Nowinski
Alan Schwarz
Keith Primeau
Cindy Parlow Cone
Bob Costas
Isaiah Kacyvenski
Bill Daly
Brendan Shanahan
Robert Cantu, MD
Ann McKee, MD
Robert Stern, PhD
Hunt Batjer, MD
Gary Dorshimer, MD
Ruben Echemendia, PhD
Douglas Smith, MD
Steven Galetta, MD
Laura Balcer, MD, MSCE
Christina Master, MD
Eric Laudano, M.H.S., A.T.C.

Critical and media reception 
Head Games was a critical success, winning Best Documentary at the 2012 Boston Film Festival and Sports Illustrated Best Sports Movie of 2012. Head Games was also an official selection for both the 2012 International Documentary Film Festival Amsterdam and the 2012 Sprout Film Festival. The films was also noted in iTunes Best of 2012 and Rotten Tomatoes Top Movies of 2012.

Roger Ebert gave the film three stars noting that "the documentary by Steve James paints a devastating picture of the long-term consequences of head injuries among pro NFL players." Ebert also called Head Games one of the year's "best documentaries." The New York Times stated "Head Games gains credibility and power from compassion for athletes and respect for their accomplishments. But it also tries to open the eyes of sports lovers to dangers that have too often been minimized and too seldom fully understood." The Pittsburgh Post Gazette listed the film as one of the year's best films.

In March 2014, UK Distributor Dogwoof announced that it would be a launching doc-centric digital distribution platform entitled IF365 to help filmmakers get their work on top digital platforms. IF365 will use Dogwoof’s relationship with platforms such as iTunes and Netflix to showcase feature documentaries including Head Games: The Global Concussion Crisis.

References

External links
Official site

Head Games: Violent games, life-long pain, Globe & Mail
Head Games: Steve James’ new concussion documentary overstates the evidence on head injuries in sports (Slate)
Head Games review (AV Club)
Five questions (or more): Head Games director Steve James (CBS Sports)
As Suicides, Brain Injuries Mount, Safety of Football Questioned, from NFL to Youth Leagues (Democracy Now!)

2012 films
2012 documentary films
2010s sports films
Documentary films about American football
American sports documentary films
Neurotrauma
Sports controversies
Films directed by Steve James
Documentary films about health care
American football controversies
Variance Films films
2010s English-language films
2010s American films
Films about disability